HMS Contest was one of three s to serve with the Royal Navy.

She was launched on 1 December 1894 at the Laird, Son and Co shipyard, Birkenhead, and served most of her career in home waters.

Service history
Contest served as part of the Medway Instructional Flotilla in 1901. In July 1902 she was part of the escort meeting , which brought back to England the remains of Lord Pauncefote, British ambassador to the US who died while in office. Lieutenant Henry Ralph Heathcote was appointed in command on 1 August 1902 (a temporary appointment of Lieutenant L. J. I. Hammond in command appears to have been cancelled), when she was tender to HMS Cambridge, gunnery school ship off Plymouth. Later the same month she took part in the Coronation Review for King Edward VII on 16 August 1902. Following the review, she was paid off into the Fleet Reserve to have new boiler feedwater pumps fitted.

She was sold for scrap on 11 July 1911 for £1760.

Notes

Bibliography

 

Banshee-class destroyers
Ships built on the River Mersey
1894 ships